Whittenburg is a ghost town in Hutchinson County, Texas, United States. It was founded by area rancher James A. Whittenburg when oil was discovered in the area in 1926. In 1936, Whittenburg merged with Pantex to form Phillips, since a ghost town.

Another ghost town in the area is Plemons, where the newspaper publisher and Republican politician Roy Whittenburg was born in 1913.

External links
 TexasScapes entry for Whittenburg

Geography of Hutchinson County, Texas
Ghost towns in the Texas Panhandle
1926 establishments in Texas